F.C. PAF is a women's football team in Japan.

Honors

Domestic competitions

Empress's Cup All-Japan Women's Football Tournament
Runners-up (1) : 1981

Results

External links
 F.C. PAF official site

Women's football clubs in Japan
Association football clubs established in 1979
1991 establishments in Japan
Football clubs in Tokyo